Loganville High School (LHS) is located in Walton County, United States.

Walton County has nine elementary, three middle, and three high schools, and a Performance Learning Center.

The school
Loganville High School is a public, four-year comprehensive high school for grades nine through twelve. It is accredited by the Southern Association of Colleges and Schools.

The present school facility was first occupied in the fall of 1998. In January 2002, a new wing was opened to house an additional 450 students.

With an enrollment of approximately 2,000 students, LHS is a school in transition from rural to urban.

In 2008 LHS was awarded bronze for the highest percentage of students meeting and exceeding standards.

Faculty
Loganville High School employs 137 teachers, four administrators, four counselors, and two media specialists. 22 staff members are certified to work with gifted children. The school also employs five secretaries, ten paraprofessionals, two school resource officers, one school nurse, and eight other support personnel. Five parent volunteers supplement the secretarial and administrative support positions on a regular basis. Many more volunteer their services on testing days and other special occasions.

The principal is Brad Bolemon. The assistant principals are John Lamb, Amanda McMillan, Niles Davis, and Carrin Meadows.

Grading scale

Curriculum
LHS uses a 4x4 block schedule that offers academic, technology/career, and elective credits.

Four levels each of Spanish and French are available.

Work-based learning is offered through the Youth Apprenticeship Program. Areas of concentration include cosmetology, business, early childhood education, construction, horticulture, and health care.

Walton Career Academy offers students a chance to take collegiate level courses during high school through the Walton County Public School System. Students can receive both high school and college credit.

Advanced Placement
Twelve AP courses are offered at LHS. Approximately 200 students take advantage of these course offerings.  Courses are weighted by adding 10 points to the total class grade. These courses include:

AP US History
AP World History
AP Government
AP Economics
AP Calculus
AP Statistics
AP Language
AP Literature
AP Biology
AP Chemistry
AP Art
AP Computer Science
AP Physics
AP Human Geography
AP Psychology

Testing
Georgia High School Graduation Test (first-time takers in 11th grade):
 
2005-2006
Language Arts: 42%
Math: 51%
Science: 2%
Social Studies: 56%
Writing: 1%

2004-2005
Language Arts:	41%
Math: 5%
Science: -15%
Social Studies: 9%
Writing: 19%

Graduation requirements

Before graduation, students must accumulate a minimum of 28 units or credits.

Post-secondary plans
Class of 2006:
Four year colleges/universities: 26%
Two year colleges/schools: 28%
Technical/vocational colleges/schools: 11%
Military: 3%
Full-time employment: 3%
Graduation rate: 79.9%

Sports

Baseball
Basketball
Cheerleading
Cross country
Football
Golf
Soccer
Softball
Swimming
Tennis
Track and field
Volleyball
Wrestling

Clubs and organizations

Academic Bowl
AFJROTC
Archery
Beta Club
Chorus
Classic Gaming Club
Color Guard
FCCLA
Fellowship of Christian Athletes
Foreign Language Club
Future Business Leaders of America
Future Educators of America
Future Farmers of America
Future Georgia Educators
Key Club
Literary Team
Marching Band
National Honor Society
S.A.D.D.
S.A.F.E.
SGA
Technology Student Association

Alma mater
Performed by the Loganville High School Marching Red Devils/Choir:

Across the hills of dear old Walton
Lives a noble clan
Songs of Loganville wait for glory
A grand and glorious band
Alma Mater, thee we'll honor
Ever loyal be
Thee, we'll crown forever with glory
Loganville, here's to thee.

Notable alumni
 Michael Bohn, Class of 2006 - singer for Woe, Is Me and Issues
 Clint Frazier, Class of 2013 - MLB player for the New York Yankees
 J.R. Jenkins, Class of 1997 - former NFL player
 Storm Johnson, Class of 2010 - former NFL player
 Brandon Moss, Class of 2002 - MLB player for the Oakland Athletics
 Jordan Rager, Class of 2012 - "Voice" of Loganville

References

External links
 http://www.loganvillehigh.org/

Public high schools in Georgia (U.S. state)
Schools in Walton County, Georgia
1970 establishments in Georgia (U.S. state)